Bob Chinn may refer to:

Bob Chinn (film director) (born 1943), American adult film director
Bob Chinn (restaurateur) (1923–2022), American owner of Bob Chinn's Crab House

See also
Bobby Chinn (born 1964), American international chef and television presenter
Bobby Chinn (restaurant), restaurant in Hanoi, Vietnam